Moussa Souleiman (born 1962) is a Djiboutian long-distance athlete.

Souleiman competed for his country at the 1992 Summer Olympics held in Barcelona, he entered the 5000 metres where he came 13th in his heat so didn't qualify for the next round.

References

1962 births
Living people
Athletes (track and field) at the 1992 Summer Olympics
Olympic athletes of Djibouti
Djiboutian male long-distance runners